The North Dakota House of Representatives is the lower house of the North Dakota Legislative Assembly and is larger than the North Dakota Senate.

North Dakota is divided into between 40 and 54 legislative districts apportioned by population as determined by the decennial census. The 2000 redistricting plan provided for 47 districts. As each district elects two Representatives to the House, there are currently 94 representatives in the House.

Representatives serve four-year terms. Elections are staggered such that half the districts have elections every two years. Originally, the North Dakota Constitution limited members of the North Dakota House of Representatives to two-year terms, with all representatives standing for reelection at the same time. That practice continued until 1996, when the voters approved a constitutional amendment that changed the term for representatives to four-years with staggered terms. The amendment went into effect July 1, 1997, and was first applied in the 1998 elections. Every two years half the districts elect both their representatives by block voting. In the 2022 North Dakota elections, a ballot measure passed with 63.4% of the vote creating term limits of eight years in the North Dakota House, which was put into effect starting January 2023.

The House Chamber is located in the North Dakota State Capitol in Bismarck, North Dakota.

Composition of the House

67th Legislative Assembly (2021–2023)

2021–2022 officers

Members of the 67th House
The below individuals are members of the North Dakota House of Representatives for the 67th Legislative Assembly (2021–2023). 

†Representative was appointed when they first joined the House

Past composition of the House of Representatives

See also
List of speakers of the North Dakota House of Representatives
List of majority leaders of the North Dakota House of Representatives

References

External links
North Dakota Legislative Assembly official site
North Dakota House of Representatives at Ballotpedia
 Legislature of North Dakota at Project Vote Smart
North Dakota campaign financing at FollowTheMoney.org

North Dakota Legislative Assembly
State lower houses in the United States